Pelham Anderson Barrows (March 13, 1861 – November 30, 1939) served as the 16th lieutenant governor of Nebraska from 1919 to 1923 under Governor Samuel Roy McKelvie.  He also served a stint as commander of the Sons of Union Veterans of the Civil War.  A native of Massachusetts, he later moved to California, where he died in 1939.

References

External links

Lieutenant Governors of Nebraska
1861 births
1939 deaths
People from Massachusetts